Jean Malonga (February 25, 1907 in Kibouende, French Congo – 1985) is credited as one of the earliest of the modern Republic of Congo writers.  Prior to Malonga, Congolese literature in Brazzaville consisted of scattered pre-World War II French language works.  He began his career as a writer in the Kongo language magazine Liaison. He was also a Congolese politician who served in the French Senate from 1948 to 1955.

Works
 Coeur d'Aryenne (Heart of Aryenne) (1954)

References

http://aflit.arts.uwa.edu.au/CountryCongoEN.html

1907 births
1985 deaths
Republic of the Congo writers
People from Brazzaville
Republic of the Congo politicians
French Senators of the Fourth Republic
Senators of French Equatorial Africa